Maurice Raynal (3 February 1884, Paris – 18 September 1954, Suresnes) was a French art critic and an ardent propagandist of cubism.

Some publications 
Essai de Définition de la Peinture Cubiste, Bulletin de la Section d'Or, Paris, 9 October 1912
Quelques Intentions du Cubisme, I'Effort Moderne, 1919
Picasso, 1921
Juan Gris et la métaphore plastique, Feuilles Libres, 1923
Quelques Intentions du Cubisme, Bulletin de I'Effort Moderne, nos. 1, 2, 3, January-March, 1924
Anthologie de la Peinture en France de 1906 a nos jours, Paris, Editions Montaigne, 1927
 Modern French Painters, Brentano's, New York, 1928
Histoire de la peinture moderne de Baudelaire à Bonnard, Skira, Geneva, 1949
 Modern Painting: Painting, Color, History. (1953). Editions D'Art Albert Skira, Geneva, 339 pp. [Translated to English by Stuart Gilbert]

Bibliography 
David Raynal, Maurice Raynal – La Bande à Picasso, éd. Ouest-France, 2008,   
Georg Schmidt (Einl.): Geschichte der modernen Malerei. Matisse − Munch − Rouault. Fauvismus und Expressionismus. Text and Documentation by Maurice Raynal and others, Skira, 1950

References

External links 
 
 Maurice Raynal on Data.bnf.fr
 La personne Maurice Raynal Centre Pompidou

Writers from Paris
1884 births
1954 deaths
French art critics